The Ministry of Cooperatives, Labour, and Social Welfare is an Iranian government body responsible for the oversight of Cooperative business, regulation and implementation of policies applicable to labour and social affairs. It also oversees the Social Security (social welfare) of Iran. The social security (social welfare) program was formed on 3 August 2011 to insure the well-being of the people in Iran.

This Ministry was formed in 2011 by merging the Ministry of Cooperatives, Ministry of Labour and Ministry of Social Welfare. Merging of Ministries lowers the number of employments positions.

In the country, the activities of Minister of C.L.S. are focused on the regulation of labor laws, well-being of the workforce and stopping the brain drain. The Ministry of C.L.S. manages the entrepreneurship in Iran. It manages the annual entrepreneurs festival. In the festival, prizes are donated to the winners of The National Festival of Entrepreneurs in Iran.

Notable people
Former and first Minister of Ministry of Cooperatives, Labor and Social Welfare (Ministry of C.L.S.) Reza Sheykoleslam was a governor of Hormozgan Province .

The last minister of Ministry of Cooperatives before the merger with the Ministry of Labor and Ministry of Social Welfare Mohammad Abbasi was an athlete before he became the minister. He won over 4 gold, 5 silver, and 3 bronze medals during his sports career.

Former Vice Minister of Ministry of Cooperatives Bahman Salehi is now the minister of the renewable energy corporation SUNIR.

Former General Director of Planning of Ministry of Cooperatives Alireza Nasiri is the founder of online education programs in Iran and is also manages the forestation sector of Iran.

Former Minister of Ministry of Cooperatives, Labor and Social Welfare Asadollah Abbasi is now a parliamentary representative for Rudsar.

See also
 Ministry of Welfare and Social Security (Iran)
 Cabinet of Iran
 Government of Iran
 Iranian labor law
 Iranian Labour News Agency
The National Festival of Entrepreneurs in Iran

References

2011 establishments in Iran
Cooperatives, Labour, and Social Welfare
Ministries established in 2011
Ministry of Cooperatives Labour and Social Welfare (Iran)